A live CD or live DVD is a CD-ROM or DVD-ROM containing a bootable computer operating system. Live CDs are unique in that they have the ability to run a complete, modern operating system on a computer lacking mutable secondary storage, such as a hard disk drive.

Rescue and repair 
 Billix – A multiboot distribution and system administration toolkit with the ability to install any of the included Linux distributions
 Inquisitor – Linux kernel-based hardware diagnostics, stress testing and benchmarking live CD
 Parted Magic – Entirely based on the 2.6 or newer Linux kernels
 System Folder of classic Mac OS on a CD or on a floppy disk – Works on any media readable by 68k or PowerPC Macintosh computers
 SystemRescueCD – A Linux kernel-based CD with tools for Windows and Linux repairs

BSD-based

FreeBSD based 
 DesktopBSD – as of 1.6RC1 FreeBSD and FreeSBIE based
 FreeBSD – has supported use of a "fixit" CD for diagnostics since 1996
 FreeNAS – m0n0wall-based
 FreeSBIE (discontinued) – FreeBSD-based
 GhostBSD – FreeBSD based with gnome GUI, installable to HDD
 Ging – Debian GNU/kFreeBSD-based
 m0n0wall (discontinued) – FreeBSD-based
 TrueOS – FreeBSD-based
 pfSense – m0n0wall-based

Other BSDs 
 DragonFly BSD

Linux kernel-based

Arch Linux based 
 Artix – LXQt preconfigured and OpenRC-oriented live CD and distribution
 Archie – live CD version of Arch Linux.
 Antergos
 Chakra
 Manjaro – primarily free software operating system for personal computers aimed at ease of use.
 Parabola GNU/Linux-libre - distro endorsed by the Free Software Foundation
 SystemRescueCD

Debian-based 
These are directly based on Debian:
 antiX – A light-weight edition based on Debian
 Debian Live – Official live CD version of Debian
 Finnix – A small system administration live CD, based on Debian testing, and available for x86 and PowerPC architectures
 grml – Installable live CD for sysadmins and text tool users
 HandyLinux – A French/English Linux distribution derived from Debian designed for inexperienced computer users
 Instant WebKiosk – Live, browser only operating system for use in web kiosks and digital signage deployments
 Kali Linux – The most advanced penetration testing distribution
 Knoppix – The "original" Debian-based live CD
 MX Linux – Live based on Debian stable
 Tails – An Amnesic OS based on anonymity and Tor
 Slax – (formerly based on Slackware) modular and very easy to remaster
 Webconverger – Kiosk software that boots live in order to turn PC into temporary Web kiosk

Knoppix-based 
A large number of live CDs are based on Knoppix. The list of those is in the derivatives section of the Knoppix article.

Ubuntu-based 
These are based at least partially on Ubuntu, which is based on Debian:
 CGAL LiveCD – Live CD containing CGAL with all demos compiled. This enables the user to get an impression of CGAL and create CGAL software without the need to install CGAL.
 Emmabuntüs is a Linux distribution derived from Ubuntu and designed to facilitate the repacking of computers donated to Emmaüs Communities.
 gNewSense – Supported by the Free Software Foundation, includes GNOME
 gOS – A series of lightweight operating systems based on Ubuntu with Ajax-based applications and other Web 2.0 applications, geared to beginning users, installable live CD
 Linux Mint – Installable live CD
 Mythbuntu – A self-contained media center suite based on Ubuntu and MythTV
 OpenGEU – Installable live CD
 PC/OS – An Ubuntu derivative whose interface was made to look like BeOS. a 64 bit version was released in May 2009. In 2010 PC/OS moved to a more unified look to its parent distribution and a GNOME version was released on March 3, 2010.
 Pinguy – An Ubuntu-based distribution designed to look and feel simple. Pinguy is designed with the intent of integrating new users to Linux.
 Puredyne – Live CD/DVD/USB for media artists and designers, based on Ubuntu and Debian Live
 Qimo 4 Kids – A fun distro for kids that comes with educational games
 Trisquel – Supported by the Free Software Foundation, includes GNOME
 TurnKey Linux Virtual Appliance Library – Family of installable live CD appliances optimized for ease of use in server-type usage scenarios
 Ubuntu and Lubuntu – Bootable live CDs

Other Debian-based 
 AVLinux – AVLinux is a Linux for multimedia content creators.
 CrunchBang Linux – Installable live CD, using Openbox as window manager
 Damn Small Linux – Very light and small with JWM and Fluxbox, installable live CD
 DemoLinux (versions 2 and 3) – One of the first live CDs
 Dreamlinux – Installable live CD to hard drives or flash media * This distribution has ceased support *
 gnuLinEx – Includes GNOME
 Kanotix – Installable live CD
 MEPIS – Installable live CD

Gentoo-based 
 Bitdefender Rescue CD
 Calculate Linux
 FireballISO – VMware virtual machine that generates a customized security-hardened IPv4 and IPv6 firewall live CD.
 Incognito – includes anonymity and security tools such as Tor by default
 Kaspersky Rescue Disk
 Pentoo
 SabayonLinux
 Ututo
 VidaLinux

Mandriva-based 
 DemoLinux (version 1)
 Mageia – installable live CD
 Mandriva Linux – installable live CD; GNOME and KDE editions available

openSUSE-based 
 openSuSE – official Novell/SuSE-GmbH version – installable live CD; GNOME and KDE versions available

Red Hat Linux/Fedora-based
 Berry Linux
 CentOS – installable live CD
 Fedora – installable live CD, with GNOME or KDE
 Korora – installable live USB (recommended over DVD), with Cinnamon, GNOME, KDE, MATE, or Xfce
 Network Security Toolkit – installable live disc, with GNOME or Fluxbox

Slackware-based 
 AUSTRUMI – 50 MB Mini distro
 BioSLAX – a bioinformatics live CD with over 300 bioinformatics applications
 NimbleX – under 200 MB
 Porteus – under 300 MB
 Salix
 Slackware-live ( CD / USB images with latest update from slackware-current )
 SuperGamer – gaming focused (currently based on Vector Linux)
 Vector Linux (Standard and SOHO Editions)
 Zenwalk

Other 
 Acronis Rescue Media – to make disk images from hard disk drives
 CHAOS – small (6 MB) and designed for creating ad hoc computer clusters
 EnGarde Secure Linux – a highly secure Linux based on SE Linux
 GeeXboX – a self-contained media center suite based on Linux and MPlayer
 GoboLinux – an alternative Linux distribution. Its most salient feature is its reorganization of the filesystem hierarchy. Under GoboLinux, each program has its own subdirectory tree.
 Granular – installable live CD based on PCLinuxOS, featuring KDE and Enlightenment
 Lightweight Portable Security – developed and publicly distributed by the United States Department of Defense’s Software Protection Initiative to serve as a  secure end node
 LinuxConsole – a lightweight distro on installable CD for old computers with a focus on youth and casual users.
 Linux From Scratch Live CD (live CD inactive) – used as a starting point for a Linux From Scratch installation
 Nanolinux – 14 MB distro on an installable live CD with BusyBox and Fltk, for desktop computing
 paldo – independently developed, rolling release distribution on installable live CD
 PCLinuxOS – installable live CD for desktop computing use
 Puppy Linux – installable live CD, very small
 SliTaz – installable live CD, one of the smallest available with good feature set
 Tiny Core Linux – based on Linux 2.6 kernel, BusyBox, Tiny X, Fltk, and Flwm, begins at 10 MB
 XBMC Live – a self-contained media center suite based on Embedded Linux and XBMC Media Center

OS X-based 
 DasBoot by SubRosaSoft.com
 OSx86 (x86 only)

Windows-based 
Microsoft representatives have described third-party efforts at producing Windows-based live CDs as "improperly licensed" uses of Windows, unless used solely to rescue a properly licensed installation. However, Nu2 Productions believes the use of BartPE is legal provided that one Windows license is purchased for each BartPE CD, and the Windows license is used for nothing else.
 BartPE – allows creation of a bootable CD from Windows XP and Windows Server 2003 installation files
 WinBuilder – allows the creation of a bootable CD from Windows 2000 and later
 Windows Preinstallation Environment

OpenSolaris-based 

Systems based on the former open source "OS/net Nevada" or ONNV open source project by Sun Microsystems.
 BeleniX – full live CD and live USB distribution (moving to Illumos?)
 OpenSolaris – the former official distribution supported by Sun Microsystems based on ONNV and some closed source parts

Illumos-based 
Illumos is a fork of the former OpenSolaris ONNV aiming to further develop the ONNV and replacing the closed source parts while remaining binary compatible. The following products are based upon Illumos:
 Nexenta OS – combines the GNU userland with the OpenSolaris kernel.
 OpenIndiana – since OpenIndiana 151a based on Illumos

Other operating systems 
 AmigaOS 4 – Installable live CD
 Arch Hurd – A live CD of Arch Linux with the GNU Hurd as its kernel
 AROS – Offers live CD for download on the project page
 BeOS – All BeOS discs can be run in live CD mode, although PowerPC versions need to be kickstarted from Mac OS 8 when run on Apple or clone hardware
 FreeDOS – the official "Full CD" 1.0 release includes a live CD portion
 Haiku – Haiku is a free and open source operating system compatible with BeOS running on Intel x86 platforms instead of PowerPC.
 Hiren's BootCD
 Minix
 MorphOS – Installable live CD
 OpenVMS – Installable live CD
 OS/2 Ecomstation Demo
 Plan 9 from Bell Labs – Has a live CD, which is also its install CD (and the installer is a shell script).
 QNX
 ReactOS
 SkyOS
 Syllable Desktop

Live USBs 

This list is for operating systems distributions that are specifically designed to boot off a (writable) USB flash drive, often called a USB stick.
(This does not include operating system distributions with a simplified "installer" designed to boot from a USB drive, but the full OS is intended to be installed on a hard drive).

 Tin Hat Linux
 Tails ("The Amnesic Incognito Live System")
 SystemRescue
 Sugar
 SliTaz
 Slax
 RUNT Linux
 Puredyne
 Puppy Linux
 Porteus
 Parted Magic
 Parsix
 NimbleX
 Lightweight Portable Security
 Knoppix
 Kanotix
 Grml
 Finnix
 Feather Linux
 Damn Small Linux
 Billix

In addition, many other operating systems can be made to run from a USB flash drive,
possibly using one of the List of tools to create Live USB systems.

See also 
 List of Linux distributions that run from RAM
 List of portable software
 List of tools to create Live USB systems
 Windows To Go

References

External links 
 The LiveCD List
 

Live CDs
Live CD